Ruby Agnes (Monaghan) Lee (24 May 1916 – 10 June 2012) was one of the earliest women cricketers. An Australian born in Coniston, New South Wales, Monaghan was a right-handed batter and right-arm medium bowler, and she opened the batting to face the first deliveries of the first ever Women's Test match, the Australia Women versus England Women Test at Brisbane on 28 December 1934. She had earned selection after strong showings at a warm-up game against the same touring England side in the weeks prior to the Test. Upon the merging of men's and women's cricket administrations in 2003, she was awarded the third Women's Test cap. She came to the sport after playing vigaro, and resumed playing softball and tennis after ending her time with cricket. She died in Wollongong.

Personal life
Monaghan married William Lee on 30 March 1940.

References

External links
 

1916 births
2012 deaths
Australia women Test cricketers
Sportspeople from Wollongong